Sidi Ladjel District is a district of Djelfa Province, Algeria.

Municipalities
The district is further divided into 3 municipalities:
Sidi Ladjel
El Khemis
Hassi Fedoul

Districts of Djelfa Province